Thomas Edward Graves, Jr. (born December 18, 1955) is a former professional American football linebacker. He played one season in the National Football League (NFL) for the Pittsburgh Steelers. As a rookie, he won a Super Bowl ring with the Steelers in Super Bowl XIV over the Los Angeles Rams.

References 

1955 births
Living people
Players of American football from Norfolk, Virginia
American football linebackers
Michigan State Spartans football players
Pittsburgh Steelers players